Bad Tennstedt is a Verwaltungsgemeinschaft in the district of Unstrut-Hainich-Kreis in Thuringia, Germany. The seat of the Verwaltungsgemeinschaft is in Bad Tennstedt.

The Verwaltungsgemeinschaft Bad Tennstedt consists of the following municipalities:

 Bad Tennstedt 
 Ballhausen 
 Blankenburg 
 Bruchstedt 
 Haussömmern 
 Hornsömmern 
 Kirchheilingen 
 Kutzleben 
 Mittelsömmern 
 Sundhausen 
 Tottleben 
 Urleben

References

Verwaltungsgemeinschaften in Thuringia